Karimabad (also Romanized as Karīmābād) is a village in Khodabandehlu Rural District, in the Central District of Sahneh County, Kermanshah Province, Iran. At the 2006 census, its population was 81, in 21 families.

References 

Populated places in Sahneh County